Wei-Assipu-tepui, also known as Little Roraima or Roraimita, is a minor tepui of the Eastern Tepuis chain. It lies just off the northeastern flank of Roraima-tepui, directly on the border between Brazil and the disputed Guayana Esequiba territory, claimed by Venezuela but controlled by Guyana, and very close to the tripoint of all three countries. The mountain is known for its extensive cave systems, with one extending for over a kilometre.

Its summit plateau is highly dissected and generally inclined south-southwest (towards the Brazilian side). The rocky summit is partially forested, with flowering plants of the genus Bonnetia featuring prominently. It also hosts a number of carnivorous plants, including Heliamphora glabra, Heliamphora nutans, and the natural hybrid between the two. The various rock cavities of Wei-Assipu-tepui are home to nesting colonies of white-collared swifts (Streptoprocne zonaris) and oilbirds (Steatornis caripensis). For the latter species, Wei-Assipu-tepui is the easternmost recorded locality in mainland South America, and the first known nesting site in Brazil. The mountain's summit supports a greater variety of herpetofauna than the less vegetated plateaus of nearby Roraima-tepui, Kukenán-tepui, Yuruaní-tepui, and Ilú-tepui. Day temperatures of 17 °C have been recorded on the summit plateau, falling to 12 °C overnight, with slightly lower values in the more sheltered caves.

In the first expedition of its type to Wei-Assipu-tepui, an Italian–Venezuelan team of speleologists explored the mountain's summit plateau in July 2000, surveying four caves and several minor cavities. On this expedition were also discovered four previously unknown species of frogs (one of which was later described as Oreophrynella weiassipuensis), and at least two of harvestmen.

According to Carreño et al. (2002), the oldest biblio-cartographic reference to the mountain is likely that of Marie Penelope Rose Clementi (wife of Cecil Clementi), circa 1920, who recounted how its location was determined with a prismatic compass during an English expedition of 1915.

See also
 Distribution of Heliamphora

References

Further reading

  Carreño, R., J. Nolla & J. Astort (2001). Resultados preliminares de la expedición espeleológica Italo-Venezolana al Macizo del Roraima. VI Jornadas Venezolanas de Espeleología, Noviembre 2001, Maracay. Resúmenes, pp. 19–21.
 Désamoré, A., A. Vanderpoorten, B. Laenen, S.R. Gradstein & P.J.R. Kok (30 September 2010). Biogeography of the Lost World (Pantepui region, northeastern South America): insights from bryophytes. Phytotaxa 9: 254–265.
 Kok, P.J.R., D.B. Means & F. Bossuyt (30 June 2011). A new highland species of Pristimantis Jiménez de la Espada, 1871 (Anura: Strabomantidae) from the Pantepui region, northern South America. Zootaxa 2934: 1–19.
 Kok, P.J.R., R.D. MacCulloch, D.B. Means, K. Roelants, I. Van Bocxlaer & F. Bossuyt (7 August 2012).  Current Biology 22(15): R589–R590.  []

External links
 Return to the Tepuis — National Geographic film about expedition to Wei-Assipu-tepui

Tepuis of Brazil
Tepuis of Guyana
International mountains of South America
Brazil–Guyana border
Landforms of Roraima